Bardia is a town in Libya.

Bardia may also refer to:

 Bardia (Nepal), a region of Nepal
 Bardia, New South Wales, a suburb of Sydney

See also
 Battle of Bardia, fought in this town 3 to 5 January 1941
 Bardiya (disambiguation)